Monodellidae is a family of crustaceans belonging to the order Thermosbaenacea.

Genera:
 Monodella Ruffo, 1949
 Tethysbaena Wagner, 1994

References

Crustaceans